Warm Braw is a foehn wind in the Schouten Islands north of New Guinea.

References

Winds